The Masked Dancer is an American reality competition television series that aired on Fox from December 27, 2020, to February 17, 2021. Craig Robinson hosted the show, with Ken Jeong, Paula Abdul, Brian Austin Green, and Ashley Tisdale serving as panelists. Like The Masked Singer format, celebrity contestants wear head-to-toe costumes and face masks that conceal their identities, but perform solo, with a partner, or with a crew in different dance styles. The show began as a recurring segment on Ellen DeGeneres' daytime talk show which spoofed The Masked Singer. In pre-production since January 2020, filming was delayed until October due to the COVID-19 pandemic in the United States.

Format

Panelists and host

Actor and comedian Craig Robinson hosted the show. The Masked Singer panelist and comedian Ken Jeong, entertainer Paula Abdul, actor Brian Austin Green (who performed as "Giraffe" on The Masked Singers fourth season), and actress and singer Ashley Tisdale served as panelists. Guest panelists included Cheryl Hines in the third episode, Rob Lowe in the fourth episode, Whitney Cummings in the fifth episode, Mayim Bialik in the sixth episode, and Will Arnett in the seventh episode.

Production

Background and development
The Masked Dancer is a spin-off of The Masked Singer which debuted in January 2019 and became a surprise hit for Fox, averaging about 11.5 million viewers per episode in its first season. The show continued as the highest-rated non-sports program in the United States during its next two seasons. The series involves celebrities who are disguised in full costumes and face masks which conceal their identities. After performing a song, a panel attempts to guess their identities using clues given. After all have performed in an episode, the panelists and the audience vote for the favorite, and the least popular must take off their mask to reveal their identity. It is a derivative of the Masked Singer format which originated in South Korea.

Within a week of The Masked Singers premiere, Ellen DeGeneres introduced a spoof segment, "The Masked Dancer", on her eponymous talk show. Segments featured disguised celebrities Sean Hayes, Howie Mandel, Colton Underwood, and Derek Hough. Masked Singer panelists Ken Jeong and Nicole Scherzinger participated in later segments, as did the show's host, Nick Cannon. The day after the first segment aired, Rob Wade, head of alternative entertainment and specials at Fox, contacted The Ellen DeGeneres Show producers about a possible television series. Wade said the network could have proceeded without DeGeneres' involvement, but felt she was "passionate about it ... [and] has great access to celebrities". The Masked Dancer was announced in January 2020 as a "straight-to-series" addition at Fox's winter Television Critics Association press tour. It is a co-production of Fox Alternative Entertainment and Warner Brothers Unscripted & Alternative Television.

Filming
Production filmed in Los Angeles at Red Studios where The Masked Singer has also filmed. As of January 2020, they had started casting the show. Some of the show challenges for the production is how the dancing is to be presented, as a solo, like The Masked Singer, in duets, which is more traditional for dancing competitions, and in group numbers, or a combination. Additionally, they accepted that the contestants need to speak, but like The Masked Singer, they would need to, in some way, disguise the voice. Like The Masked Singer, the contestants utilize elaborate costumes, made easier to dance in, but with a "similar eccentricity" including headpieces and they compete by performing dances that "could be a group dance or dances with another person". Unlike that show, The Masked Dancer requires more rehearsals as the celebrity contestants have to learn the choreography.

Originally expected to debut in the middle of 2020, production was delayed until October due to the COVID-19 pandemic.

Broadcast
Fox aired the series in the United States. Though it was scheduled between two seasons of The Masked Singer, the network was unconcerned about audience burnout as episodes were shorter and less frequent than other reality competition series. CTV, which broadcasts The Masked Singer in Canada, simulcasts the show in that country.

Contestants
The series features 10 contestants, who were announced on November 4, 12, and 25, 2020. The contestants in this series have sold more than 38 million albums worldwide, 20 Emmy Awards wins, 20 Grammy nominations, 10 World Dancing titles, five New York Times Best-Selling Author titles, four Olympic gold medals, and three appearances in Broadway shows.

Episodes

Week 1 (December 27)

Week 2 (January 6)

Week 3 (January 13)

Week 4 (January 20)

Week 5 (January 27)

Week 6 (February 3)

Week 7 (February 10)
Group performance: "Shut Up & Dance" by Walk the Moon

Week 8 (February 17)
Group performance: "(I've Had) the Time of My Life" by Bill Medley and Jennifer Warnes (performed by Craig Robinson)

Ratings

Notes

References

External links
 
 

English-language television shows
Fox Broadcasting Company original programming
Television series by Fox Entertainment
Television series by A Very Good Production
Television series by Warner Horizon Television
Television productions postponed due to the COVID-19 pandemic
American television spin-offs
Reality television spin-offs
Dance competition television shows
2020s American reality television series
2020 American television series debuts
2021 American television series endings
Masked Dancer